Dhruvan is an Indian actor who works primarily in Malayalam cinema.

Career
Dhruvan started his career as a junior artist in Lisammayude Veedu. He garnered recognition through the film Queen (2018), in which he portrayed the role of Balu, the male lead role in the film Queen, directed by Dijo Jose Antony.

Filmography

References

External links

Facebook

Indian male film actors
Living people
Male actors from Palakkad
Male actors in Malayalam cinema
Indian male television actors
Male actors in Malayalam television
21st-century Indian male actors
1994 births